Do Make Say Think is the self-titled debut album of Do Make Say Think. It was released in March 1999 by Constellation Records.

The album was originally self-released and distributed on November 3, 1998 by the band members. However, it was later delivered to Constellation Records, where it was formally released by the record label. This marked the first time that Constellation had released material by a band outside of Quebec.

The recording took place in the CIUT-FM radio studios of the University of Toronto and at the Harris Institute for the Arts.

The packaging includes a window in the front through which one of three provided pieces of card can be displayed, each bearing a design on both sides.

Track listing

Personnel

Do Make Say Think

 Ohad Benchetrit – guitar, bass, saxophone, flute
 Jason McKenzie – keyboards, effects
 Dave Mitchell – drums
 James Payment – drums
 Justin Small – guitar
 Charles Spearin – guitar, bass, trumpet

Technical

 Do Make Say Think – producer

Notes

External links
 Constellation Records' Official Homepage

1997 debut albums
Constellation Records (Canada) albums
Do Make Say Think albums